Eastern Suburbs (now known as the Sydney Roosters) competed in their 32nd New South Wales Rugby League season in 1939.

Details
In the 1939 season Eastern Suburbs line-up contained the following players:- ???(Coach); Jack Arnold, W. Bamford, D. Bartlett, Dave Brown, S. Callaghan, H. 'Nick'Dalton, Percy Dermond, Dick Dunn, Noel Hollingdale, Henry 'Harry' Pierce, Ray Stehr

Ladder

References

External links
Rugby League Tables and Statistics

Sydney Roosters seasons
East